Koaia may refer to:

 Koaia (plant), a Hawaiian tree species
 Koaiá poeople, an ethnic group of Brazil
 Koaiá language, a language of Brazil

Language and nationality disambiguation pages